Lists of Members of the Parliament of the United Kingdom (MPs) for United Kingdom constituencies in Wales:

 List of MPs for constituencies in Wales (1974–1979)
 List of MPs for constituencies in Wales (1987–1992)
 List of MPs for constituencies in Wales (1992–1997)
 List of MPs for constituencies in Wales (1997–2001)
 List of MPs for constituencies in Wales (2001–2005)
 List of MPs for constituencies in Wales (2005–2010)
 List of MPs for constituencies in Wales (2010–2015)
 List of MPs for constituencies in Wales (2015–2017)
 List of MPs for constituencies in Wales (2017–2019)
 List of MPs for constituencies in Wales (2019–present)